The 2009–10 FA Women's Cup was an association football knockout tournament for women's teams, held between 13 September 2009 and 3 May 2010. It was the 39th season of the FA Women's Cup and was won by Everton, who defeated Arsenal in the final. The tournament consisted of a preliminary round, four qualifying rounds and eight rounds of competition proper.

The competition began on 13 September 2009 when the 24 lowest-ranked teams in the tournament took part in the preliminary round, however only eleven games were played due to the withdrawal of Stokesley, allowing Forest Hall YPC to progress to first qualifying round.

All match results and dates from the Football Association website.

Teams
A total of 245 teams had their entries to the tournament accepted by The Football Association. Twenty-four teams entered at the preliminary round stage, while a further 140 joined entered at first round qualifying. Teams that played in the four regional Combination leagues (South West, South East, Midland and Northern) were given an exemption to the first round proper, while teams in the FA Women's Premier League Northern Division and FA Women's Premier League Southern Division entered at the third round stage. Teams in the FA Women's Premier League National Division, which at the time was the top flight of women's football in England, were given byes to the fourth round.

Preliminary round
All games were played on 13 September 2009.

First round qualifying
All games were played on 27 September 2009.

Second round qualifying
All games were played on 11 October 2009.

Third round qualifying
All games were played on 25 October 2009, with the exception of the Harraby Catholic Club v Hull City tie, which was played on 8 November in Hull after twice having been postponed.

First round
All games were originally scheduled for 8 November 2009. The tie between Cullompton Rangers and Forest Green Rovers was postponed four times, before Cullompton withdrew from the competition, allowing Forest Green to progress to the next round.

Second round
All games were originally scheduled for 29 November 2009.

Third round
All games were originally scheduled for 13 December 2009.

Fourth round
All games were originally scheduled for 10 January 2010.

Fifth round
All games were played on 7 or 14 February 2010.

Sixth round
The games at Arsenal and Everton were played on their original scheduled date of 14 February. The ties at Aston Villa and barnet, were scheduled to be played a week later, but snow and waterlogged pitch meant they were not played until 7 March.

Semi finals
The game at Everton was played on 14 March, while Barnet's tie at Everton took place on 4 April.

Final

References

Women's FA Cup seasons
2009–10 in English women's football